Zulfiya Salakharqyzy Chinshanlo (born 25 July 1993) is a Kazakhstani weightlifter. She set a world record in the clean and jerk on 29 July 2012 at the 2012 London Olympics by lifting 131 kg.

However, the validity of her record and title was called into question by a positive blood test result for the banned steroids oxandrolone and stanozolol, and she was "provisionally suspended" by the International Weightlifting Federation.  Chinshanlo earned a gold medal at the 2014 World Championships. This was Kazakhstan's first podium finish at the competition.

On 27 October 2016, the IOC stripped her of both her gold medal and world and Olympic records as a result of her doping positive.

In July 2021, she represented Kazakhstan at the 2020 Summer Olympics in Tokyo, Japan. She won the bronze medal in the women's 55 kg event.

Athletic career
On 8 November 2012, Kazakhstan London Olympic champion Zulfiya Chinshanlo got the Olympic Council of Asia award as the best Asian athlete, along with Ilya Ilyin and Olga Rypakova.

Zulfiya, according to her official profile, is an ethnic Dungan and speaks a Chinese language (Dungan language) as her first language.

According to Chinese official media Xinhua News, Zulfiya was born and grew up in Hunan Province, China, thus she has a Chinese name and can speak Chinese much more fluently than Russian. She emigrated to Kazakhstan in 2008 along with Maiya Maneza with the approval of Hunan sport officials on a five-year lease contract. She returned to China in 2012.

Chinese media wrote that the weightlifter received her Chinese ID in the Public Security Department of Changsha city on 22 October and was going to join the Chinese national team, because her 5-year contract with Kazakhstan allegedly expired.

But Kazakhstan sports authorities insist that Zulfiya Chinshanlo is a citizen of Kazakhstan:

"Zulfiya Chinshanlo is our sportswoman. I don’t know why foreign media is discussing a change of her citizenship. She is a citizen of Kazakhstan. She had been living and training in Kazakhstan since she was 14. No official claims have been submitted to our Agency or the Weightlifting Federation. Zulfiya was on vacation and decided to visit her relatives in China. After a break she will go back to training for the world championships and the next Olympics as a member of Kazakhstan national team," Agency for Sports and Physical Culture Talgat Yermegiyayev said.

On 27 October 2012, Chinshanlo came back from China and announced:

"I would like to say that everything written about me in China is not true. I have proved it by coming back to Kazakhstan and being here right now. I would like to thank everyone who supported me. Once again, all these rumors are lies and I don’t want to return to discussing this issue again."

However, according to official Kazakh records, Zulfiya was born 25 July 1993 in Almaty, Kazakhstan. 
Her father Salakhar Chinshanlo is a businessman who speaks fluently both Russian and Dungan language.

Chinese media says her father is Guisheng Zhao, from Hunan Province, a baker running a bakery in her hometown - Daoxian, who only speaks Mandarin Chinese, he also once said "bring my daughter back (from Kazakhstan)". And in the video we can see her contract with Kazakh. She and Yao Meili (Yao li) aka Maiya Maneza were sold to Kazakhstan (reporters believe) for $25,000 each and then became Kazakh citizens. Chinshanlo rejected the claim.

Major results

In June 2016, IWF announced that retests of the samples taken from the 2012 Olympics indicated that Zulfiya Chinshanlo had tested positive for prohibited substances, namely Oxandrolone and Stanazolol. Three other Kazakhs failed the doping test: Ilya Ilyin, Maiya Maneza and Svetlana Podobedova. They were disqualified and had their Olympic medals revoked on Oct 27, 2016.

References

External links

 
 
 
 
 

1993 births
Living people
Hui sportspeople
People from Yongzhou
Kazakhstani female weightlifters
Chinese female weightlifters
Olympic weightlifters of Kazakhstan
Weightlifters at the 2010 Summer Youth Olympics
Weightlifters at the 2012 Summer Olympics
Weightlifters at the 2020 Summer Olympics
Olympic bronze medalists for Kazakhstan
Competitors stripped of Summer Olympics medals
Medalists at the 2020 Summer Olympics
Olympic medalists in weightlifting
World Weightlifting Championships medalists
Weightlifters at the 2010 Asian Games
Weightlifters at the 2014 Asian Games
Medalists at the 2010 Asian Games
Medalists at the 2014 Asian Games
Asian Games medalists in weightlifting
Asian Games silver medalists for Kazakhstan
Weightlifters from Hunan
Doping cases in weightlifting
Kazakhstani sportspeople in doping cases
Kazakhstani people of Chinese descent
Kazakhstani people of Hui descent
Naturalised citizens of Kazakhstan
21st-century Kazakhstani women